Boris Tatar (born March 17, 1993) is a Montenegrin footballer who most recently played as a defender for Budućnost Dobanovci.

Club career
Tatar started his career in his native Montenegro, going through youth ranks of the biggest club in Montenegro Budućnost Podgorica before turning out on loan for FK Kom and Mladost Podgorica before moving to Australia to join NPL Victoria side Bentleigh Greens, where he made 12 appearances. Owing to difficulties in obtaining new Australian visa and limiting the number of foreign players in NPL Victoria he was forced to return to Montenegro to play for FK Zabjelo before moving once more to Finland, where he played for Ekenäs Sport Club and Lahti.

He joined Japanese side Machida Zelvia in early 2017.

In season 2018/19, he returned to Montenegro playing for FK Otrant. On 21 June 2019, Tatar joined OFK Titograd.

References

External links
 
 

 UEFA Profile

1993 births
Living people
Footballers from Podgorica
Association football defenders
Montenegrin footballers
Montenegro youth international footballers
Montenegro under-21 international footballers
FK Budućnost Podgorica players
FK Kom players
OFK Titograd players
Bentleigh Greens SC players
FK Zabjelo players
Ekenäs IF players
FC Lahti players
FC Machida Zelvia players
FK Budućnost Dobanovci players
Montenegrin First League players
Kakkonen players
Veikkausliiga players
Montenegrin Second League players
Serbian First League players
Montenegrin expatriate footballers
Expatriate soccer players in Australia
Montenegrin expatriate sportspeople in Australia
Expatriate footballers in Finland
Montenegrin expatriate sportspeople in Finland
Expatriate footballers in Japan
Montenegrin expatriate sportspeople in Japan
Expatriate footballers in Serbia
Montenegrin expatriate sportspeople in Serbia